The mediastinum testis is a network of fibrous connective tissue that extends from the top to near the bottom of each testis. It is wider above than below.

Numerous imperfect septa are given off from its front and sides, which radiate toward the surface of the testes and are attached to the tunica albuginea. These divide the interior of the testes into a number of incomplete spaces called lobules. These are somewhat cone-shaped, being broad at their bases at the surface of the gland, and becoming narrower as they converge to the mediastinum.

The mediastinum supports the rete testis and blood vessels of the testis in their passage to and from the substance of the gland.

Additional images

References

External links
  "Mediastinum (human)"
  - "Inguinal Region, Scrotum and Testes: Testis"

Mammal male reproductive system